Allen & Heath (also known as AH or A&H) is a company based in Penryn, Cornwall, England, specialising in the manufacture of audio mixing consoles.  Allen & Heath also makes sound management systems for industrial installations and DJ mixers for nightclubs.
Allen & Heath is part of the Audiotonix Group.

History
Founded in 1969, the company became more widely known after involvement by Andy Bereza, Ivor Taylor, and Andrew Stirling.

In the early 1970s Allen & Heath built a custom quadraphonic mixing console for the band Pink Floyd, the MOD1, which was used by Alan Parsons to mix their live performances.  The MOD1 can be seen in their movie "Live at Pompeii".

Allen & Heath was acquired by Harman International in 1991.  By 2001 the manufacturer's turnover had increased tenfold.

In July 2001 there was a management buyout of the company with investment coming from 3i and Bank of Scotland.  The board consisted of the four then-current directors, plus two non-executive directors from its investment partners.

In March 2006 Close Growth Capital brought 3i's share for £9m in a secondary buyout.  The company then employed 180 people with a turnover of £15 million.

In April 2008, A&H was sold to D&M Holdings Inc.

In June 2013, D&M Holdings sold Allen & Heath to private equity firm, Electra Partners. £43 million of equity and debt was provided by Electra Private Equity PLC and Allen & Heath's management.

Product lineup

dLive 
The  series of consoles are designed for professional touring and broadcast uses. They are used by many engineers in the industry due to its high expandability and features. There are two classes of : C class, and S Class. The C class being more compact. The  surface requires the use of the Allen & Heath's proprietary MixRack external rack-mounted mixer engine which also provides some input/output functionality. It also supports Allen and Heath's digital snake system, providing high-quality audio over Ethernet.

Avantis 
With many of the facilities of the  it differs in the fact the surface itself contains the mix engine and thus does not require the use of the external MixRack.

SQ 
The SQ line is a step up from the previous (Qu) generation of mixers. It does not require an Allen & Heath MixRack due to the mixer engine being internal. It does support Allen and Heath digital snake system as the dLive.

Qu 
The Qu series is a digital mixing system for recording and sound reinforcement. It is designed to be a convenient and intuitive system for engineers already familiar with analog equipment, making the introduction to digital mixing relatively easy. It supports wireless control and monitoring via several apps for iOS and Android. The consoles are also compatible with Allen & Heath's  for digital audio over Ethernet.

References

External links

XONE DJ Products
Neil Hauser Interview - NAMM Oral History Library (2011)
Andy Bereza Interview - NAMM Oral History Library (2011)

DJ equipment
Audio mixing console manufacturers
English brands
Penryn, Cornwall